H. hastatus may refer to:
 Heliophanus hastatus, a jumping spider species found in South Africa
 Heteropaussus hastatus, a beetle species in the genus Heteropaussus (ant nest beetles)
 Hibiscus hastatus, a large shrub or tree species

See also
 Hastatus (disambiguation)